When studying literature, biography and its relationship to literature is often a subject of literary criticism, and is treated in several different forms. Two scholarly approaches use biography or biographical approaches to the past as a tool for interpreting literature: literary biography and biographical criticism. Conversely, two genres of fiction rely heavily on the incorporation of biographical elements into their content: biographical fiction and autobiographical fiction.

Literary biography
A literary biography is the biographical exploration of the lives of writers and artists. Biographies about artists and writers are sometimes some of the most complicated forms of biography. Not only does the author of the biography have to write about the subject of the biography but also must incorporate discussion of the subject-author's literary works into the biography itself. Literary biographers must balance the weight of commentary on the subject-author's oeuvre (complete body of works) against the biographical content to create a coherent narrative of the subject-author's live. This balance is interpretively-influenced by the degree of biographical elements inherent in an author's literary works. The close relationship between writers and their work relies on ideas that connect human psychology and literature and can be examined through psychoanalytic theory.

Literary biography may address subject-authors whose oeuvre contains a plethora of autobiographical information and who welcome the biographical analysis of their work. Elizabeth Longford, a biographer of Wilfrid Blunt, noted, "Writers are articulate and tend to leave eloquent source material which the biographer will be eager to use." The opposite may also be the case, some authors and artists go out of their way to discourage the writing of their biographies, as was the case with Kafka, Eliot, Orwell and Auden. Auden said, "Biographies of writers whether written by others or themselves are always superfluous and usually in bad taste.... His private life is, or should be, of no concern to anybody except himself, his family and his friends."

Well-received literary biographies include Richard Ellmann's James Joyce and George Painter's Marcel Proust.

Biographical criticism

Biographical fiction

Biographical fiction is a type of historical fiction that takes a historical individual and recreates elements of his or her life, while telling a fictional narrative, usually in the genres of film or the novel. The relationship between the biographical and the fictional may vary within different pieces of biographical fiction. It frequently includes selective information and self-censoring of the past. The characters are often real people or based on real people, but the need for "truthful" representation is less strict than in biography. 

The various philosophies behind biographical fiction lead to different types of content. Some asserts itself as a factual narrative about the historical individual, like Gore Vidal's Lincoln. Other biographical fiction creates two parallel strands of narrative, one in the contemporary world and one focusing on the biographical history, such as Malcolm Bradbury's To the Hermitage and Michael Cunningham's The Hours. No matter what style of biographical fiction is used, the novelist usually starts the writing process with historical research.

Biographical fiction has its roots in late 19th and early 20th-century novels based loosely on the lives of famous people,  but without direct reference to them, such as George Meredith's Diana of the Crossways (1885) and Somerset Maugham's The Moon and Sixpence (1919). During the early part of the 20th century this became a distinct genre, with novels that were explicitly about individuals' lives.

Autobiographical fiction

Autobiographical fiction, or autofiction, is fiction that incorporates the author's own experience into the narrative. It allows authors to both relay and reflect on their own experience. However, the reading of the autobiographical fiction need not always be associated with the author. Such books may be treated as distinct fictional works.

Autobiographical fiction includes the thoughts and view of the narrator which describes their way of thinking.

References

Works cited

Further reading

Biography (genre)
Literary criticism
Literature by topic